The 1898 LSU Tigers football team represented the LSU Tigers of Louisiana State University during the 1898 Southern Intercollegiate Athletic Association football season. The Tigers, with new coach Edmond Chavanne, played only one game for the 1898 season. It was their third undefeated season.  Another outbreak of yellow fever similar to the one in 1897 caused LSU to play only one game. By the time LSU was able to play its only game of the season, Allen Jeardeau had departed from the school as head football coach, and no provision had been made to replace him.  The job of coach then fell to the team's captain, Edmond Chavanne, the only player-coach in LSU football history. 1898 marked the final year of play for William S. Slaughter. He was LSU's first five time football letterman.

Schedule

Roster

References

LSU
LSU Tigers football seasons
College football undefeated seasons
LSU Tigers football